Kenneth Lee Parker (born 1972) is an American lawyer who has served as the United States attorney for the Southern District of Ohio since 2021.

Education

Parker received his Bachelor of Science, magna cum laude, from Tuskegee University in 1994 and his Juris Doctor from the Indiana University Maurer School of Law in 1997.

Career

From 1997 to 1999, Parker served as a law clerk for Judge S. Arthur Spiegel of the United States District Court for the Southern District of Ohio. From 2003 to 2005, he served as an adjunct professor of federal criminal practice at the University of Cincinnati College of Law. He served as chief of the criminal division from 2011 to 2019 and as chief of the organized crime drug enforcement task force from 2010 to 2011. From 1999 to 2021, he served as an Assistant United States Attorney in the United States Attorney’s office for the Southern District of Ohio.

U.S. Attorney for the Southern District of Ohio 

On September 28, 2021, President Joe Biden nominated Parker to be the United States Attorney for the Southern District of Ohio. On November 4, 2021, his nomination was reported out of committee by voice vote. Senators Josh Hawley and Marsha Blackburn voted no record. On November 19, 2021, his nomination was confirmed in the United States Senate by voice vote. He was sworn into office on November 23, 2021.

References

External links
 Biography at U.S. Department of Justice

1972 births
Living people
20th-century American lawyers
21st-century American lawyers
African-American lawyers
Assistant United States Attorneys
Indiana University Maurer School of Law alumni
Lawyers from Cincinnati
Ohio lawyers
Tuskegee University alumni
United States Attorneys for the Southern District of Ohio